Camaegeria is a genus of moths in the family Sesiidae. The genus was erected by Embrik Strand in 1914.

Species
Species of this genus are:
Camaegeria aristura (Meyrick, 1931)
Camaegeria auripicta Strand, 1914
Camaegeria exochiformis (Walker, 1856)
Camaegeria lychnitis Bartsch & Berg, 2012
Camaegeria massai Bartsch & Berg, 2012
Camaegeria monogama (Meyrick, 1932)
Camaegeria polytelis Bartsch & Berg, 2012
Camaegeria sophax (Druce, 1899)
Camaegeria sylvestralis (Viette, 1955)
Camaegeria viettei Bartsch & Berg, 2012
Camaegeria xanthomos 	Bartsch & Berg, 2012
Camaegeria xanthopimplaeformis (Viette, 1956)

References

Sesiidae
Taxa named by Embrik Strand
Moth genera